Anne-Lise Bakken (born 30 March 1952) is a Norwegian politician for the Labour Party. She was a member of the Norwegian Parliamentfrom 1977–1989. In 1986 she was appointed Minister of Administration and Consumer Affairs in the Second Brundtland Government, but was forced to retire due to perceived misconduct in 1988.

References

1952 births
Living people
Government ministers of Norway
Women members of the Storting
Directors of government agencies of Norway
Members of the Storting
Labour Party (Norway) politicians
20th-century Norwegian politicians
20th-century Norwegian women politicians
Women government ministers of Norway